The Expulsion may refer to:

 The Expulsion (film), a 1923 silent German drama film
 Expulsion of the Acadians, the forced removal by the British of the Acadian people
 Expulsion of Poles by Germany, a prolonged anti-Polish campaign of ethnic cleansing
 Expulsion of Poles by Nazi Germany, the forced resettlement of over 1.7 million ethnic Poles from all territories of occupied Poland
 Flight and expulsion of Germans (1944–1950), the forced migration of millions of Reichsdeutsche from various European states and territories

See also
 Indian removal